Ahidus, also sometimes called ahidous, haidous, tahidoust or hidoussi, is a Berber style of collective performance in Morocco. It is the traditional dance in many Berber tribes and is known to be the favorite entertainment of these tribes.

Description 
The traditional Ahidous performance includes songs, dances and impromptu poetry performed by a group of performers standing shoulder to shoulder along with other men and women. They all form either a large circle or two facing lines. The man who accompanies and directs the dancer, called the leader of the dance or Ammehreb in Berber, stands in the center of the formation and adjust the rhythm.

Origins and characteristics 
The origins of Ahidus are not very known because of the lack of extensive research studies and investigations. However, Ahidus is believed to find its origin in the Berber tribe of Zenata.

The initial formation of the dance was done by making a closed circle which indicated the unity between the performers in particular and the inhabitants of the tribe in general. The leader of the dance would stand in the middle and lead the group.

An important aspect of Ahidus which did not change through the years is the traditional uniform. For men, it mostly is a white djellaba and a turban as symbols of peace. As for women, they were free to wear either white or colourful kaftans coupled with silver jewellery.

Ahidou dances are considered an expression of victory after a conflict or war.

Gallery

References

External links 
 Mediterranean Memory - Ahidous

Moroccan styles of music
Berber music